69th New York Film Critics Circle Awards
January 11, 2004

Best Picture:
 The Lord of the Rings:The Return of the King

The 69th New York Film Critics Circle Awards, honoring the best in film for 2003, were announced on 15 December 2003 and presented on 11 January 2004 by the New York Film Critics Circle.

Winners

Best Actor:
Bill Murray – Lost in Translation
Runners-up: Sean Penn – Mystic River and Jack Black – School of Rock
Best Actress:
Hope Davis – American Splendor and The Secret Lives of Dentists
Runners-up: Naomi Watts – 21 Grams and Charlize Theron – Monster
Best Animated Film:
The Triplets of Belleville (Les triplettes de Belleville)
Runner-up: Finding Nemo
Best Cinematography:
Harris Savides – Elephant and Gerry
Best Director:
Sofia Coppola – Lost in Translation
Runner-up: Peter Jackson – The Lord of the Rings: The Return of the King
Best Film:
The Lord of the Rings: The Return of the King
Runners-up: Mystic River, American Splendor, and Lost in Translation
Best First Film:
Shari Springer Berman and Robert Pulcini – American Splendor
Best Foreign Language Film:
City of God (Cidade de Deus) • Brazil/France/United States
Runner-up: The Man Without a Past (Mies vailla menneisyyttä) • Finland
Best Non-Fiction Film:
Capturing the Friedmans
Runner-up: The Fog of War
Best Screenplay:
Craig Lucas – The Secret Lives of Dentists
Runners-up: Steven Knight – Dirty Pretty Things and Sofia Coppola – Lost in Translation
Best Supporting Actor:
Eugene Levy – A Mighty Wind
Best Supporting Actress:
Shohreh Aghdashloo – House of Sand and Fog

References

External links
 2003 Awards

2003
New York Film Critics Circle Awards, 2003
New York Film Critics Circle Awards, 2003
New
New York

ja:第69回ニューヨーク映画批評家協会賞